The 2011 Walt Disney World Pro Soccer Classic was a preseason soccer tournament held at Walt Disney World's ESPN Wide World of Sports Complex. The tournament, the second edition of the Pro Soccer Classic, was held from February 24 to 26 and featured three Major League Soccer clubs alongside one USL Pro club.

The tournament was won by FC Dallas, who defeated Houston Dynamo on penalties in the final.

Teams
The following four clubs competed in the tournament:

 Orlando City from the USL Professional Division, hosts (1st appearance) 
 Toronto FC from Major League Soccer (2nd appearance)
 FC Dallas from Major League Soccer (2nd appearance)
 Houston Dynamo from Major League Soccer (2nd appearance)

Matches

Semi-finals

Championship Round

Consolation match

Final

External links
 Official Site 
 WDW Pro Soccer Classic Facebook page

2011 in American soccer
2011